The 1935 Wisconsin Badgers football team was an American football team that represented the University of Wisconsin in the 1935 Big Ten Conference football season. The team compiled a 1–7 record (1–4 against conference opponents) and finished in a tie for ninth place in the Big Ten Conference. Clarence Spears was in his fourth and final year as Wisconsin's head coach. This was the first time since 1918 that the Badgers lost their opening game of the season.

Fullback Eddie Jankowski was selected as the team's most valuable player. Ray Davis was the team captain.

The team played its home games at Camp Randall Stadium, which had a capacity of 32,700. During the 1935 season, the average attendance at home games was 15,889.

Schedule

References

Wisconsin
Wisconsin Badgers football seasons
Wisconsin Badgers football